Volcom is a lifestyle brand that designs, markets, and distributes boardsports-oriented products. Volcom is headquartered in Costa Mesa, California, U.S. The brand is known for its trademark stone logo, its slogan True to This, and the Let the Kids Ride Free campaign. Todd Hymel is the CEO of Volcom.

History

1991–1995: Origins
Volcom was founded in 1991 by Richard "Wooly" Woolcott and Tucker "T-Dawg" Hall, who based the ethos of the company on their own experiences with boardsports. In March 1991, the two friends went on a snowboarding trip to Tahoe, U.S., and afterward, they decided to start a clothing company.

Chet Thomas was the first professional skateboarder to be sponsored by the brand. In 1995, Volcom was the first action sports company to create a record label, Volcom Entertainment.

1995–2011: IPO, Kering and ABG acquisitions
In April 2005, the company adopted its current name, "Volcom, Inc." Volcom became a publicly traded entity on June 29, 2005, when Wachovia Securities, D.A. Davidson and Piper Jaffray underwrote an initial public offering on NASDAQ.  They priced 4.69 million shares at US$19 a share, raising a total of US$89 million.

In early 2008, Volcom made its first acquisition, taking ownership of Electric Visual Evolution LLC for US$25.3 million. In early 2016, Eric Crane acquired the brand from Volcom for an undisclosed amount.

On May 2, 2011, PPR (turned Kering in 2013) launched a friendly takeover offer to buy Volcom Inc. for US$24.50 a share, valuing the company at US$608 million. Volcom's board unanimously backed the PPR offer, and shareholders were advised to tender their shares to the French company.

Since the takeover, Kering has sought to expand and diversify the Volcom brand. The support from Kering allowed Volcom to launch its first ever closed-toe footwear line in July 2013.

On April 3, 2019, Authentic Brands Group had announced it acquired Volcom from Kering.

Retail
Volcom's first retail store was opened on November 23, 2002, in Los Angeles. Since then, seven more Volcom stores have opened in the United States, and six more in Canada.

Outside America, Volcom has numerous international retail stores including locations in Barcelona, Spain; Hossegor, Bordeaux, and Paris, France; two locations in Bali, Indonesia; Tokyo, Japan; Durban and Pretoria, South Africa; Bangkok, Thailand; London and Falmouth, England; Melbourne, Australia; Buenos Aires, Argentina; Santiago, Chile; Lima, Perú; São Paulo, Brazil; Isla de Margarita, Venezuela; Lisbon, Portugal; Stuttgart, Germany; Davos, Switzerland, Calgary, Edmonton, Vancouver, Winnipeg, and Fort McMurray, Canada, Costa Rica; Amsterdam, the Netherlands and Guam.

Teams

Surfing

Laura Coviella
Noa Deane
Dusty Payne
Balaram Stack
Mitch Coleborn
Gony Zubizarreta
Parker Coffin
Andrew Doheny
Ozzy Wright
Nate Tyler
Yago Dora
Ryan Burch
Gavin Beschen
Kobi Clements
Joan Duru 
Maud Le Car
Coco Ho
Jack Robinson

Skateboarding
 Pedro Barros
 Alec Majerus
Rune Glifberg
Dustin Dollin
 Caswell Berry
 Daan Van Der Linden
 Colin Provost
 Grant Taylor
 Dane Burman
 Jackson Pilz
 Axel Cruysberghs
 Omar Hassan
 Victor Cortez
 CJ Collins
 Chima Ferguson
Chris Pfanner
Simon Bannerot
Milton Martinez
Rachelle Vinberg
David Gravette
Stella Reynolds

Snowboarding

 Pat Moore
 Bryan Iguchi
 Curtis Ciszek
 Dylan Alito
 Elena Hight
 Hailey Langland
 Jamie Lynn
 Markus Keller
 Mike Ravelson
 Scott Blum
Arthur Longo
Terje Haakonsen
Torgeir Bergrem
Marcus Kleveland
 Reid Smith
 Scotty James
 Marcus Klevland

Volcomunity
Volcomunity is an online space for Volcom ambassadors—singers, models, and designers to blog about their lives. Natalie Suarez, Jennifer Herrema, Billie Edwards, Elle Green, Mike Correia, Stephanie Cherry, Amy Smith, Zoe Grisedale-Sherry and Hannah Logic are Volcom ambassadors.

In 2012, Volcom collaborated with Volcom ambassadors POSSO for the second time. POSSO is described by the brand as "2 best friends from Northern California with a love for art, design, fashion, and music." The collection included dresses and a bikini outfit.

Events

2013 Volcom Pipe Pro Event
The 2013 Volcom Pipe Pro surf competition that took place between January 27 and February 7, 2013, has been designated as a Deep Blue Surfing Event as it completed the ASP (Association of Surfing Professionals) Green Guidelines Recommendations. The event strove to reduce the environmental impacts of a professional surfing contest and to provide social benefits for the local community.

2014 Volcom Pipe Pro Event
The 2014 Volcom Pipe Pro surf competition took place between January 26 and February 7, 2014, at the Banzai Pipeline with waves at 8–12 feet, and was televised on Saturday, June 7, 2014, on NBC. The competition is an ASP, WQS (World Qualifying Series) 5-Star Event with a $130,000 prize purse, and once again has been designated as a Deep Blue Surfing Event, working with Sustainable Surf, a waste diversion company.

Philanthropy
Volcom created the "V.Co-logical Series" collection, whereby one percent of sales are donated to environmentally focused non-profit organizations. The company is a member of the "1% for the Planet" initiative.

In 2011, Volcom collaborated with Krochet Kids International, an organization that seeks to reduce poverty. Volcom sold handmade clothes from Uganda and some of the revenue was donated to Krochet Kids International.

Awards
In 2003, Woolcott was named the Surf Industry Manufacturers Association Individual Achiever of the Year. In 2004, Woolcott was inducted into the National Scholastic Surfing Association Hall of Fame.

In 2010, Volcom won the TransWorld Business Industry and Retail Award: “Brand of the Year”. Also in 2010, Woolcott was nominated for the Entrepreneur of the Year Award at Chapman University by the Leatherby Entrepreneurship Center.

References

External links
 

Clothing brands of the United States
Companies based in Costa Mesa, California
Clothing companies established in 1991
Skateboarding companies
Snowboarding companies
Surfwear brands
1990s fashion
2000s fashion
2010s fashion
Swimwear brands
1991 establishments in California
2005 initial public offerings
2011 mergers and acquisitions
2019 mergers and acquisitions
Authentic Brands Group